MS Bari was a ferry built in 1980 as the St Anselm for Sealink. Starting life on the Dover-Calais, she operated with Ventouris Ferries in her last routes in the Mediterranean.

Sealink
MS Bari started life as the St Anselm, order by and for Sealink services in the English Channel. She was launched at the Harland & Wolff shipyard in Belfast on 5 December 1979 and completed her maiden voyage on 27 October 1980.

After two years in service, on 31 December 1982, the St Anselm returned to Belfast for a £750,000 extension to her aft decks. On 28 March 1983 during her trip back to Dover through the Irish Sea, the St Anselm was temporarily brought into service on the Fishguard-Rosslare route following the failure of s engines.

In 1990, the St Anselm was displaced from the Dover-Calais route by Sealinks acquisition of the Fantasia, the St Anselm instead took up a service operating between Folkestone and Boulogne. Not long after this transition, Sealink was acquired by Stena Line, in 1991 the St Anselm was transferred to Holyhead, being renamed the Stena Cambria as a refit relief during February and March, briefly returning to Dover before resuming service in the Irish Sea in July that same year.

Stena Line
In July 1995, SNAT announced they would be terminating the pooling agreement that had been in place with Stena Sealink Line, which as a result, dropped the "Sealink" name, becoming just Stena Line. As a result of the loss of the two French vessels, Stena Line transferred the Stena Cambria and the Stena Empereur back to the Dover-Calais route for the 1996 season. In March 1998 she transferred to the Newhaven-Dieppe route under the newly formed P&O Stena Line, staying there until the routes withdrawal in January 1999.

Post P&O Stena Line
Following the routes withdrawal in January 1999, the Stena Cambria was laid up in Zeebrugge awaiting sale, eventually being purchased by UMAFISA, entering service for them between Barcelona and Ibiza that November as the Isla de Botafoc. In August 2003, UMAFISA and the Isla de Botafoc were acquired by rivals, Balearia. She continued services with Balearia to Ibiza and Menorca until her eventual sale to Ventouris Ferries of Greece in 2010, briefly being renamed Winner 9 and then to the Bari.

Sister ships
MS Bari has three sister ships;

References

Notes

Bibliography

Ferries of Italy
1979 ships
Ships built in Belfast
Ships built by Harland and Wolff